James Austen Laird LRIBA (22 September 1878 – 14 February 1950) was an architect based in Glasgow.

Background
He was born in Glasgow, the son of John Laird (1850-1947) and Martha Barr (1851-1933)  on 7 September 1904 he married Agnes Risk Thomson (1881 - 1914) and they had four children:
John McClelland Laird (1905–1988)
Mary Risk Laird (1907–1961)
Muriel Martha Barr Laird (1909–1990)
Agnes Austen Laird (1912–2007)

In 1919 he married Janet Hamilton (Nettie) Thomson (1877–1944), older sister of his deceased wife. He died on 14 February 1950 in Croydon and left an estate valued at £35,486.

Career
He was articled to Macwhannell & Rogerson from 1894–1898 and then acted as assistant to John James Burnet from 1899–1901. He started independent practice in 1901 and worked in partnership with J.W. Laird and James Napier.

He was awarded a Licentiate of the Royal Institute of British Architects in 1911.

He is best known for Carlung House at West Kilbridge, which he designed for his uncle Robert Barr, Balmore School in Possilpark, and the Keil Hotel, Southend, Kintyre

Works
Empress Cinema, 557 Govan Street, Gorbals, Glasgow 1912
Greystones, Houston Road, Kilmacolm 1913
Balmore Public (now Greenview) School, 165 Glenhead Street, Glasgow 1929
Carlung House, West Kilbride, Ayrshire 1930
Keil Hotel, Southend, Kintyre 1937 – 1939

References

1878 births
1950 deaths
Architects from Glasgow
Scottish Plymouth Brethren